Mickaël Buffaz (born 21 May 1979 in Geneva, Switzerland) is a former French professional road bicycle racer.

Major results

2002
 1st Paris–Troyes
2003
 1st  Overall Mi-Août Bretonne
 1st Prix des Moissons
 7th Tour du Doubs
2004
 2nd Tour du Finistère
2005
 3rd Polynormande
 6th Overall Tour Nord-Isère
2006
 2nd Tour du Doubs
 8th Grand Prix de Plumelec-Morbihan
 8th Overall Regio-Tour
 8th Overall Tour de l'Ain
2007
 2nd Polynormande
 9th Overall Tour de l'Ain
2008
 4th Polynormande
 5th Overall Tour Down Under
2009
 1st Stage 1 Tour de l'Ain
2010
 1st  Overall Paris–Corrèze
1st Stage 1
 4th Road race, National Road Championships

Grand Tour general classification results timeline

References

External links 
Personal website 
Profile at Cofidis official website 

French male cyclists
1979 births
Living people
Cyclists from Geneva